Joseph Henry Keenan (August 24, 1900 – July 17, 1977) was an American thermodynamicist and mechanical engineer noted for his work in the calculation of steam tables, research in jet-rocket propulsion, and his work in furthering the development in the understanding of the laws of thermodynamics in the mid 20th century.

His classic 1941 textbook Thermodynamics served as a fundamental teaching tool in various engineering curricula during the 1940s and 1950s.

He earned a bachelor's degree in naval architecture and marine engineering at the Massachusetts Institute of Technology in 1922. After working as a design engineer on steam turbines for General Electric Company, Keenan became an assistant professor of mechanical engineering at the Stevens Institute of Technology in 1928. In 1934, he became an associate professor of mechanical engineering at the Massachusetts Institute of Technology. He was promoted to professor in 1939. He served as Head of the Department of Mechanical Engineering from  1958 to 1961.

A major portion of Keenan’s career was devoted to the development of accurate tables of the properties of steam, which are vital to the electric power industry.  In 1929, he was appointed the U.S. delegate to the First International Conference on the Properties of Steam; he served as delegate in all successive conferences on this subject through the eighth in 1974.

In 1965, he published the classic textbook Principles of General Thermodynamics with George Hatsopoulos which was major turning point in thermodynamics since Gilbert N. Lewis and Merle Randall with their 1923 Thermodynamics textbook.  Their now famous version of the second law of thermodynamics is:

This shows that the second law of thermodynamics can be stated in terms of the existence of stable equilibrium states.

He was a fellow of the American Academy of Arts and Sciences and the American Society of Mechanical Engineers. He was award the ASME Worcester Reed Warner Medal in 1955 for work on thermodynamics and the properties of steam. He was elected to the National Academy of Engineering in 1976.

In 2007, an International Thermodynamics Symposium called “meeting the entropy challenge” was organized in M.I.T. in Honor and Memory of Professor Joseph Henry Keenan.

See also
History of thermodynamics

References

External links

http://mit.edu/keenansymposium/aboutjhkeenan/biography/index.html
http://web.mit.edu/hmtl/www/keenan.html

1900 births
1977 deaths
Thermodynamicists
American mechanical engineers
MIT School of Engineering alumni
MIT School of Engineering faculty
Stevens Institute of Technology faculty
Members of the United States National Academy of Engineering
Fellows of the American Society of Mechanical Engineers
Fellows of the American Academy of Arts and Sciences
20th-century American engineers